Engelbert Maes (1545–1630), was chief-president of the Privy Council of the Habsburg Netherlands and Council of State from 1614 to 1630, making him a central figure in the government of the Habsburg Netherlands for sixteen years.

Career
Engelbert was the son of Jacobus Maes, a member of the Council of Brabant, and Aleyde de Tassis. He was born in Antwerp and studied civil law at Leuven University, where he matriculated on 17 October 1560. After graduation he served as pensionary of the city of Antwerp. Under Alexander Farnese, Duke of Parma he became auditor general of the Army of Flanders and a member of the Great Council of Mechelen. In 1603 the Archdukes Albert and Isabella appointed him to their Privy Council, and in 1614 as president of the Privy Council and the Council of State.

He married Pauline Schoyte and together they had three children: Jean-Baptiste, later a member of the Council of Finance, and two daughters, Adrienne and Hélène, who married the brothers Jean and Charles della Faille. His wife died in 1618, he himself on 9 October 1630. He was buried in the Magdalen chapel of the Church of St Gudula (now Brussels cathedral).

References

Presidents of the Privy Council of the Habsburg Netherlands
1545 births
1630 deaths